The Sooke Flowline is an abandoned  concrete aqueduct that snakes through the Sooke Hills from Sooke Lake to the Humpback Reservoir near Mt. Wells Regional Park. From this reservoir, a buried, riveted steel pressure main transported water to Victoria.  Between 1994–2007, this main was replaced since it was long past its useful life. The flowline was vital to the continued growth of the City of Victoria as it provided a reliable water supply.  While the flowline remains, Victoria's water supply is now carried via Kapoor tunnel.  Leigh Hodgetts, CRD Waterworks superintendent, reported that the westernmost section of the flowline is still used to carry Sooke's water supply, via a 16 inch interconnecting pipe feeding the Sooke distribution system from Charters Creek to Sooke River Road.

Elk Lake used to be the water supply for Victoria and when the Colquitz River was dammed, it merely flooded the swamp and merged Elk and Beaver Lakes. Unfortunately the intake was at the swampy, shallow end of the reservoir. In the early 1900s, it was determined that Elk/Beaver Lake could no longer meet Victoria's water needs. The daily draw from the lake was too great and despite measures taken to extend its useful life, such as filter ponds, the pressure and supply was too little and sediment and amphibians were getting drawn out through the lake's intake.

Construction 

During the year of 1912, the city expropriated 40 property owners on Sooke Lake and on the proposed flowline right-of-way (ROW) at great cost. The city hired the Pacific Lock Joint Pipe Company to cast the pipe segments and using their patented design, constructed the pipeline. In between 1911–1915, this major engineering project employed over 400 workers and housed their families in rural Sooke. The pipe is almost completely at a constant elevation. Although figures vary, the slope from Sooke Lake to Humpback is between 0.0947% and 0.119% when the inverted siphons are excluded.

At the factory located at Coopers Cove, at the site of today's Stickleback Bar and Grill, round concrete segments, 36,000 in all, were mass-produced. The engineering firm, Sanderson and Porter, specified 40-inch pipe, but the company already had 42-inch molds made up so they decided to use them instead. The factory was very efficient and used steam to accelerate the curing of the concrete segments. In one 8-hour shift, 150-160 segments were produced. Three small locomotives were used to bring segments to both ends via a temporary  gauge railway and the pipe was constructed from the ends to the midpoint. At the ends, tripod derricks would unload the segments and placed them on the crushed railbed while the tracks were removed. All trees on the  right of way were cleared so that they could not fall and crush the pipe.

Maintenance 

During the flowline's operation, caretakers lived along the route in small cabins; many of them are still there today. They rode recumbent tricycles on the pipe with tilted rear wheels to stay on top. During their routes they were on the lookout for cracks in the pipe, leaky joints and trespassers.

Every  or so there are access hatches. These were meant for periodic maintenance from the inside by workers. A man would lie prone on a cart and scrape moss off the inside of the pipe and clear sediments, rocks and dead fish which inevitably backed up in places. Placed on top of these hatches were wire mesh domes, which reduced pressure build up and helped aerate the water.

Decommissioning 

The flowline was never great efficiency wise. When the taps were opened in 1915, the water which came through was high quality, but they soon discovered that they were experiencing a 50-75% water loss throughout its length, depending on the season and temperature. During summer however, the leaking was slightly reduced. This needed to be remedied by placing strips of material across the joints and fastening them with iron bands. A further challenge experienced was that the winter of 1915-16 was one of the worst in history. Parts of the newly constructed pipe got taken out by landslides and repair was difficult since the construction railway no longer existed. When the city began to outgrow the demand, the pipe section from Sooke to the Humpback Reservoir was decommissioned in 1970. The pipe had begun to show its age with many leaks and damage from falling trees and rocks. This was then replaced with the  Kapoor Tunnel bored through solid rock to the Japan Gulch Disinfection Plant near Goldstream Provincial Park.

Sooke Use
The portion of the old pipe from Sooke Lake to Sooke remained in service after the Humpback Reservoir section was decommissioned. This portion was routinely patrolled to make sure marijuana grow ops weren't tapping into the pipe and to do periodic patching up as best as possible, but it still had many leaks. Damage had also resulted from falling rocks and trees and there were concerns whether it could survive a major earthquake. The pipe by nature is fireproof. Finally in late 2009 it was replaced with a PVC pipe buried under the Galloping Goose Regional Trail. It connects to the Sooke River Road Disinfection Facility which went online in 2009. The facility incorporates ultraviolet disinfection (UV), and is followed by the addition of chlorine and ammonia.

Materials 

There are 54 trestles along the  length of various sizes spanning ravines. During construction, temporary timber trestles were built alongside the proposed trestles to avoid construction delays and speed up construction of the permanent concrete trestles.

Six concrete trestles are made out of wood staves preserved with creosote and bound with iron bands. These were built to reduce the length around the longest of ravines. The wooden trestles actually dip down one side of the ravine and go up the other relying on the downward pressure to push the water back up.

There is also one metal trestle over Ayum Creek near Sooke.

Protection

Heritage Protection 

At this time, there is currently no heritage protection on this structure. There is a concern from CRD waterworks that the flowline could be a liability risk. There is a growing movement to have heritage protection put on the pipe and have it transferred to CRD Regional Parks. Other notable examples of heritage protection include the concrete slabs that comprise Benvenuto Avenue which leads down to Butchart Gardens in Brentwood Bay, British Columbia.

The Sooke Region Museum 
As a pilot project of the Sooke Region Museum, surplus sections of pipe were laid out at multiple locations around the Sooke townsite accompanied by interpretive signs and historical photographs. One issue that had to be addressed is that there was still asbestos on the pipe which was used in the mortar to join the pipe segments together.

These segments can be found at the following locations:

Sooke Region Museum grounds on Phillips Road
In front of Home Hardware on Sooke Road
Holy Trinity Church on Murray Road
Sooke Municipal Hall on Otter Point Road

Utility Box Beautification 
As a part of a beautification project around the CRD, plain, boring electrical boxes were outfitted with decorative images of the pipe trestles. Such examples are at the following locations:

Helmcken Road and Watkiss Way in View Royal.
Veteran's Memorial Parkway at the E&N crossing in Langford. 
Lansdowne and Foul Bay Roads in Oak Bay.
Bay and Pleasant Street in Victoria.

Parks 
In the Sooke Parks Municipal Plan, a trail on top of the flowline within the Sooke municipal boundaries is in one of their proposed plans. The ROW also travels through Mount Wells Regional Park, Sooke Hills Wilderness Regional Park, Allman Park, Sooke Potholes Regional Park, and the Sea to Sea Green-Blue Belt Regional Park. The goal is to have the whole line encompassed within a park.

Visiting

Access

The pipe can be found and accessed at the following locations:

 - Mt. Wells Regional Park - the pipe terminus is at the Humpback Reservoir (Mt. Wells Parking lot) and it twins Humpback Road to the Sooke Highway.
 - Glinz Lake Road - drive up the road and park just before the Camp Thunderbird main gate.
 - Impala Road - this steep road is best if it's walked up. There is no room to park up the road.
 - Harbourview Road - there is a CRD parking lot at the end. Continue walking up the road for 15 minutes where you will see the pipe cross.
 - Sooke Potholes - the pipe runs north-south to the east of the Sooke River.

Traversing 

The pipe was not meant to be walked on as a trail and some parts could be dangerous. The CRD's current position is that walking on the pipe is done at one's own risk and is discouraged.

Leechtown - Sooke Potholes - Charters Creek 

This portion is easily traveled as it is in a drier climate; it is more exposed to sun, which has limited moss growth. The lack of moss actually makes the pipe more slippery. There are few blow-downs but otherwise is easily passable. There are a few aqueducts in this part, as well as the four-storey one, which should be crossed with utmost care or not crossed at all. There is a cantilevered gangway on the side which can be utilized however they are beginning to show their age and may no longer be safe.

Charters Creek - Harbourview Road 

At Charters creek there is the disinfection plant for Sooke as well as the biggest inverted siphon. After Sooke switched to the new pressure main, the flowing water poured into Charters Creek for salmon habitat enhancement but this project was later discontinued. There are no more gangways on the aqueducts beyond this point. From the north side, it is easy to get down as there is a service road but the south side is difficult and not well traveled. The embankment is loose and beyond that the pipe is quite overgrown. A path can be pushed through and tools would be of aid to clear a path. As the walk gets closer to Harbourview Road, the pipe opens up due to this part being frequented by mountain bikers. There is a really tall aqueduct here as well which crosses a logging road. A fall could be potentially deadly.

Harbourview Road - Glinz Lake Road 

This is probably the easiest segment to walk along. The pipe is very open and there are not too many trestles to cross. There is an inverted siphon in disrepair very close to Harbourview Road but it can be bypassed by an existing deer trail. Like many segments, this part is quite scenic but it passes through a quarry site, which takes away from the walk.

Glinz Lake Road - Impala Road 

There are expanses of mossy bluffs, large trees and views. There are three concrete trestles which are easily crossed as well as an inverted siphon which requires a bushwack to get around. Impala Road should not be driven up as the road is very steep, unpaved, and has no parking at the top.

Impala Road - Mt. Wells Regional Park 

The flowline passes quite close to the back yards of residences and some homeowners have even claimed the pipe corridor as their own, which is not the case. Some people may object, but you are on public land as long as you stay on the pipe. Much of this section is also nearly impassable due to overgrowth of vegetation.

See also 

Lubbe Powerhouse

References

External links

The Sooke Parks Master Plan
An article about the Sooke Lake water supply by Victoria's Ross Crockford
A PowerPoint about the Sooke Flowline's historical significance
Images of the line East and West of Impala Road
Hiking information about the Sooke Flowline

Aqueducts in Canada
History of Victoria, British Columbia
Juan de Fuca region
Transport buildings and structures in British Columbia